Apalachicola (YTB-767) was a United States Navy  named for Apalachicola, Florida.

Construction

The contract for Apalachicola was awarded 18 January 1963. She was laid down on 1 May 1963 at Mobile, Alabama, by Mobile Ship Repair and launched 26 October 1963.

Operational history
Apalachicola began service in 1965 in the 13th Naval District.  She provided harbor services to Naval and other ships in Puget Sound near Seattle. The tugboat moored during these years at Puget Sound Naval Shipyard.

Pokagon was the newest YTB class tugboat in the navy at the time. The three tugs were docked at the easternmost pier of Puget Sound Naval Shipyard, located a few hundred yards west of the Bremerton Seattle Ferry terminal.

In 1992, Apalachicola moved a crane barge from the shipyard to the Bremerton boardwalk.  The barge's crane moved a bronze statue of a ship's propeller and a shipyard worker presenting a model aircraft carrier to a young boy onto the boardwalk.  The bronze statue was forged in the shipyard and remains on the Bremerton boardwalk today.

Apalachicola underwent a main engine overhaul in 1993, during which time (approximately 5 months) she was not active.  She is now out of service.  During the time of her operation, underway movements of the tugboat required a detail of 7-8 crew members.  Whereas the makeup of the crew varied, two required members for all movements were the quartermaster (who controlled the tugboat's movement) and the Chief Engineer (who was responsible for the tugboat's operating systems).  For movements involving a large ship, a harbor pilot joined the crew and was transferred to the larger ship during the movement.

Stricken from the Navy Directory 28 October 2002, ex-Apalachicola was sold by Defense Reutilization and Marketing Service (DRMS) on 8 May 2006.

References

Natick-class large harbor tugs
Ships built in Mobile, Alabama
1963 ships